Baisha is a town of Jiangjin District, Chongqing, China. , it has 10 residential communities and 14 villages under its administration.

References

Township-level divisions of Chongqing